Equitable Bank is a Canadian bank which primarily provides residential and commercial real estate lending services, as well as personal banking through its direct banking brand EQ Bank. The bank was founded in 1970 as The Equitable Trust Company and became a Schedule I Bank offering savings products in 2013. As of 2022, it is Canada’s seventh largest bank, with nearly $103 billion in assets under management. As of February 2023, the bank had over $31 billion in deposits. Equitable Bank is a member of the Canada Deposit Insurance Corporation.

Equitable Bank provides mortgages, commercial lending services and deposit services. It is headquartered in Toronto with offices in Calgary, Halifax, Montreal and Vancouver. Equitable Bank is one of nine Schedule I banks listed on the Toronto Stock Exchange; it is listed through its parent company EQB.

History 

Equitable Bank was founded under the name The Equitable Trust Company in 1970 in Hamilton, Ontario, Canada. By 1990, The Equitable Trust Company became an operating company with $50 million in assets and four employees in its Toronto office.

In 2004, Equitable Group Inc. was created as the holding company of The Equitable Trust Company and was listed on the Toronto Stock Exchange.

Andrew Moor was appointed President and Chief Executive Officer in March 2007.

On July 1, 2013, The Equitable Trust Company was renamed Equitable Bank and became a Schedule I Bank offering savings products such as Guaranteed Investment Certificates, Tax-Free Savings Accounts, and High Interest Savings Accounts.

On June 6, 2022, Equitable Group, the holding company for Equitable Bank, changed its legal name to EQB, aligning itself with its subsidiaries.

In July 2022, Equitable Bank announced it would migrate its banking systems onto Microsoft Azure cloud infrastructure, following its digital banking platform EQ Bank. The company aims to completely transition to the cloud by 2026.

EQ Bank Expansion 
Equitable Bank launched a direct banking operation branded as EQ Bank on January 14, 2016. As a completely online banking service, EQ Bank has no branch locations. At launch the bank attracted customers with the Savings Plus Account, a high interest savings account with interest rate of 3.0%. See section: EQ Bank.

Acquisitions 
On January 1, 2019, Equitable Bank completed its acquisition of Bennington Financial Services Corp, a growing privately owned company serving the brokered equipment leasing market in Canada.

In November 2022, EQB closed its acquisition of Concentra Bank (majority then owned by SaskCentral in a deal worth $495 million, which, according to Equitable Bank, made it Canada's seventh largest bank. Concentra operated under the Wyth Financial brand, which will be replaced by the EQ Bank brand.

Products & Services

Residential products 

 Reverse mortgage
 Home Equity Line of Credit (HELOC)

Commercial products 

 Business mortgage lending

Savings products 

 Term deposits and Guaranteed Investment Certificates (GIC) 
 High Interest Savings Accounts (HISA)

Insurance lending 

 The Equitable Bank CSV FLEX Line of Credit
 The Equitable Bank Immediate Financing Agreement

EQ Bank 
EQ Bank launched on January 14, 2016 as a direct banking operation of Equitable Bank. As a completely online banking service, EQ Bank has no branch locations. It does not offer cheques or debit cards to its customers. EQ Bank is CDIC insured under Equitable Bank.

The primary product offered by EQ Bank is the Savings Plus Account, a high-interest and no-fee savings account. All of EQ Bank's products require a Savings Plus Account. 

At launch the bank attracted customers with an interest rate of 3.0%. The rate was lowered on April 18, just 96 days later, to 2.25%. The rate was lowered again to 2.0% on August 25, 2016. In May 2017 the rate was raised to 2.3%. From January to March 2020, the rate peaked at 2.45% before being reduced to 2.0% in response to reductions of the Bank of Canada interest rates due to the economic impact of the COVID-19 pandemic. The Savings Plus Account interest rate continued to reduce periodically, hitting a low of 1.25% in July 2021. In April 2022, EQ Bank began incrementally increasing its interest rate over a period of several months. As of October 2022, the interest rate for the Savings Plus Account is 2.50%.

EQ Bank began offering guaranteed investment certificates (GICs) in May 2018. The bank offers GICs from 3 month to 10-year terms.

EQ Bank moved its core banking system onto Microsoft Azure cloud infrastructure in November 2019. EQ Bank is the first bank in Canada to be hosted in the cloud. 

In 2019, it launched an international money transfer service in partnership with TransferWise (now known as Wise). On February 6, 2020, the bank announced the addition of 15 new currencies, allowing conversions of over 40+ countries.

The Joint Savings Plus Account, which allows customers to invite up to three other people, for a total of four account co-holders, was introduced in July 2020.

The EQ Bank Tax-Free Savings Account (TFSA) and the EQ Bank Retirement Savings Plan (RSP) were introduced in December 2020. Both products have no fees and can be opened online.

In May 2021, EQ Bank announced the launch of its Mortgage Marketplace, a digital service that will allow customers to shop over 2,000 mortgage products offered by various Canadian lenders. In partnership with nesto, a digital mortgage brokerage, users have the ability to be pre-qualified for a mortgage online and receive regular digital updates on the status of their application.

EQ Bank launched the EQ Bank US Dollar Account in June 2021. The no-fee account gives EQ Bank customers the ability to send US dollars internationally.

In January 2023, EQ Bank announced the launch of the EQ Bank Card, a prepaid reloadable Mastercard. The card features no foreign exchange fee, and free ATM withdrawals within Canada; fees are refunded within 10 business days. At launch, the EQ Bank Card offered a 0.5% cashback rate, with the card balance earning interest at the same rate as the Savings Plus Account.

As of February 2023, EQ Bank has over 308,000 customers and $7.9B in deposits. This follows the milestones of $5 billion in February 2021, preceded by $3 billion and $4 billion of deposits, both achieved in 2020.

Products & Services 

 Savings Plus Account
 Joint Savings Plus Account
 EQ Bank US Dollar Acount
 Mortgage Marketplace
 EQ Bank Tax-Free Savings Account
 EQ Bank Retirement Savings Plan
 EQ Bank Card

Controversy 
Upon launch, demand for EQ Bank’s 3% interest rate offer overwhelmed the bank’s operations, leading to long customer service wait times and delays in account activations. In March 2016, within three months of launch, it began to limit the number of people who could sign up for and then, implementing a reservation system on its website. A limited number of people would then be invited to sign up every week. 

CEO Andrew Moor admitted to underestimating the response from Canadians.

Awards 
In April 2021, EQ Bank was named the #1 Bank in Canada on the Forbes list of World’s Best Banks 2021. The World's Best Banks were selected based on over 43,000 consumer surveys representing 28 different countries.

In April 2022, EQ Bank ranked 2nd in Canada on the Forbes list of World's Best Banks 2022.

References

External links 

 
 

Banks of Canada
Banks established in 1970
Companies listed on the Toronto Stock Exchange
Mortgage lenders of Canada
Companies based in Toronto
1970 establishments in Ontario
Canadian companies established in 1970
Neobanks